This is a list of seasons played by Football Club Shakhtar Donetsk in Ukrainian, Soviet and European football, from 1936 (the year of the club's first entry) to the most recent completed season. Shakhtar Donetsk football club is considered to be founded as Stakhanovets, in April, 1936, on decision of All-Union Council on Physical Culture and Sports, based on former football team of Donbas. It was announced in local newspaper "Sotsialisticheskiy Donbass" (Socialist Donbas) on 9 April 1936. Itself the football team of Donbas consisted of players from Dynamo sports society some out of Stalino (now Donetsk), other from neighboring Horlivka. The team was gathered on initiative of the Yuzovka native and the team's captain Mykola Naumov and supported by the Coal-miners Union Central Committee. The first official competition, the team entered, was the 1936 Ukrainian spring tournament which was conducted by single elimination and was lost to Dynamo Odesa 2:3 in Horlivka.

During the Soviet period the club had modest achievements participating regularly in the Soviet top tier (Class A and Top League) since 1949, it missed only three seasons due to relegation. The club however won the USSR Cup in football four times and the USSR championship in football, Class B (precursor of the Soviet First League) once. Following dissolution of the Soviet Union, the club earned the most trophies becoming national leader in Ukraine. It has won the Top League/Premier League 13 times, the Ukrainian Cup in football 13 times, the Super Cup eight times, and the UEFA Cup once.

Shakhtar has appeared in several European competitions and is often a participant of the UEFA Champions League. The club became the first club in independent Ukraine to win the UEFA Cup in 2009, the last year before the competition was revamped as the Europa League. FC Shakhtar Donetsk is one of two Ukrainian clubs, the other one is Dynamo Kyiv, who have won a major UEFA competition.

Starting in 2014 the club has played (first) out of Lviv before moving early 2017 to Kharkiv with its headquarters in Kyiv. The club formerly played its home matches at the Donbass Arena, however, due to the conflict in Eastern Ukraine, the team relocated 600 miles to the west in Arena Lviv in the interim. Following the winter break of the 2016–17 season the club moved to the Metalist Stadium in Kharkiv (150 miles to the north of Donetsk) early 2017.

This list details the club's achievements in all major competitions, and the top scorers for each season. Top scorers with a "diamond" were also the top scorers in the Ukrainian league that season.

Key

Key to league record:
P – Played
W – Games won
D – Games drawn
L – Games lost
F – Goals for
A – Goals against
Pts – Points
Pos – Final position

Key to rounds:
Prel. – Preliminary round
QR1 – First qualifying round
QR2 – Second qualifying round, etc.
Inter – Intermediate round (between qualifying rounds and rounds proper)
GS – Group stage
1R – First round
2R – Second round, etc.
R64 – 1/32 Final
R32 – 1/16 Final
R16 – 1/8 Final
QF – Quarter-final
SF – Semi-final
F – Final
W – Winners
DNE – Did not enter

Seasons

Soviet Union

Ukraine

References

Shakhtar Donetsk